Robert Spencer Carr (March 26, 1909 – April 28, 1994) was an American writer of science fiction and fantasy.  He sold his first story to Weird Tales at age 15.  At age 17 his novel, The Rampant Age, became a success resulting in a movie contract. During 1975 he claimed to have knowledge of an autopsy of an alien from space on a US military base.

Works
 Spider-Bite (1926)
 The Rampant Age (1928)
 The Bells of St. Ivan's (1944)
 The Room Beyond (1948)
 Beyond Infinity (1951, stories)

External links
 Son of originator of 'Alien Autopsy' story casts doubt on father's credibility

References

 
 
 

20th-century American novelists
American fantasy writers
American male novelists
American science fiction writers
1909 births
1994 deaths
American male short story writers
20th-century American short story writers
20th-century American male writers